Gintautas Iešmantas (January 1, 1930 – September 4, 2016) was a Lithuanian politician.  In 1990 he was among those who signed the Act of the Re-Establishment of the State of Lithuania.

References

External links 
 Bibliography

1930 births
2016 deaths
Lithuanian politicians
Signatories of the Act of the Re-Establishment of the State of Lithuania